Scleria poklei is a plant in the family Cyperaceae. It is named for the Indian botanist Dileep Sadashivrao Pokle.

Distribution and habitat
Scleria poklei is endemic to India's Maharashtra state. Its habitat is wet grasslands, rice fields and forest clearings.

References

poklei
Endemic flora of India (region)
Flora of Maharashtra
Plants described in 1999